George Allen "Pat" Summerall (May 10, 1930 – April 16, 2013) was an American football player and television sportscaster who worked for CBS, Fox, and ESPN. In addition to football, he announced major golf and tennis events. Summerall announced 16 Super Bowls on network television (more than anyone else), 26 Masters Tournaments, and 21 US Opens. He contributed to 10 Super Bowl broadcasts on CBS Radio as a pregame host or analyst.

Summerall played football for the Arkansas Razorbacks and then in the National Football League (NFL) from 1952 through 1961. He was drafted by the Detroit Lions and played with Bobby Layne. His best playing years were as a kicker with the New York Giants. In 1962 he joined CBS as a color commentator. He worked with Tom Brookshier and then John Madden on NFL telecasts for CBS and Fox. Retiring after the 2002 NFL season, he occasionally announced games, especially those near his Texas home.

Summerall was named the National Sportscaster of the Year by the National Sportscasters and Sportswriters Association in 1977, and inducted into its Hall of Fame in 1994. That year, he also received the Pete Rozelle Radio-Television Award from the Pro Football Hall of Fame. He was inducted into the American Sportscasters Association Hall of Fame in 1999. The "Pat Summerall Award" has been presented since 2006 during Super Bowl weekend at the NFL's headquarters hotel "to a deserving recipient who through their career has demonstrated the character, integrity and leadership both on and off the job that the name Pat Summerall represents."

Football career

High school
At Columbia High School, Lake City, Florida, Summerall played football, tennis, baseball, and basketball. Basketball was his favorite sport, he was recognized as an All-State selection in basketball and football. He was inducted into the FHSAA Hall of Fame and was later named to the FHSAA's All-Century Team.

College
Summerall played college football from 1949 to 1951 at the University of Arkansas, where he played defensive end, tight end, and placekicker positions for the Arkansas Razorbacks. He graduated in 1953 majoring in Russian history, according to CBS News.

Professional

Summerall spent ten years as a professional football player in the National Football League, primarily as a placekicker.  The Detroit Lions drafted Summerall as a fourth-round draft choice in the 1952 NFL Draft. Summerall played the pre-season with the Lions before breaking his arm, which ended the year for him.  After that season, he was traded and went on to play for the Chicago Cardinals from 1953 to 1957 and the New York Giants from 1958 to 1961, during which he was a part of The Greatest Game Ever Played. His best professional year statistically was 1959, when Summerall scored 90 points on 30-for-30 (100%) extra-point kicking and 20-for-29 (69%) field goal kicking. 

Summerall's most memorable professional moment may well have been at the very end of the December 14, 1958 regular-season finale between his Giants and the Cleveland Browns at Yankee Stadium. Going into the game, the Browns were in first place in the Eastern Conference, holding a one-game lead over the second-place Giants. In that era, there was no overtime during regular-season games, standings ties were broken by a playoff, and there were no wild-card teams. This meant that only the Eastern Conference champion would qualify for the NFL Championship Game to be held two weeks later, and it meant that the Giants had to win just to force a tiebreaker playoff game. The Browns, on the other hand, needed only a tie to clinch the Eastern championship. As time was running out, the Giants and Browns were tied, 10–10, a situation that, as indicated, favored the Browns. The Giants got barely into Cleveland territory, then sent out Summerall to try for a tiebreaking 49-yard field goal. To add to the drama, there were swirling winds and snow.  Summerall, a straight-ahead kicker, made the field goal with just two minutes to play, keeping the Giants alive for another week (they defeated Cleveland a week later, 10–0, in the Eastern Conference tiebreaker playoff before losing the sudden-death league championship final to Baltimore the week after that).

The Giants' offensive coach, Vince Lombardi, was against sending Summerall in (Summerall missed a 31-yard attempt a few minutes earlier), then gleefully greeted Summerall as he came off the field, "You son of a bitch, you can’t kick it that far!"  Sports Illustrated ran the story as one of its primary articles the next week, with a leading photograph showing the football heading between the uprights through the snow. His last professional game was the December 31, 1961 NFL Championship Game held at Lambeau Field in Green Bay, Wisconsin. Lombardi's Green Bay Packers defeated Summerall's Giants, 37–0, holding New York to just six first downs. Summerall was not a factor in that game. 

The urban legend was his nickname became "Pat" because of the abbreviation for "point after touchdown" that a field-goal kicker was credited for in a game summary. But in a 1997 Dallas Morning News story, Summerall said after his parents divorced, he was taken in by an aunt and uncle who had a son named Mike. "My aunt and uncle just started calling me Pat to go with their Mike", Summerall would say, referencing frequently named characters in Irish jokes told during that time.

Broadcasting career
In the early 1960s, Summerall was the morning host on WCBS (AM) radio in New York City.  He left the job when WINS went all-news in 1965. He also co-hosted the syndicated NFL Films series This Week in Pro Football in the late 1960s and early 1970s. Summerall was also associated with a production company in Dallas from about 1998 through 2005 which was called Pat Summerall Productions. He was featured in and hosted various production shows, such as Summerall Success Stories and Champions of Industry. These qualified production segments would air on the Fox News Channel and later, CNN Headline News. During the mid-1990s, Summerall hosted the "Summerall-Aikman" Cowboys report with quarterback Troy Aikman. Summerall served as the host of Sports Stars of Tomorrow and Future Phenoms, two nationally syndicated high school sports shows based out of Fort Worth, Texas.  Following their dismissal of announcer Harry Caray in 1969, the St. Louis Cardinals baseball team considered hiring Summerall to be their new radio voice.

CBS Sports

NFL
After retiring from football, Summerall was hired by CBS Sports in 1962 to work as a color commentator on the network's NFL coverage. CBS initially paired Summerall with Chris Schenkel on Giants games; three years later he shifted to working with Jim Gibbons on Washington Redskins games. In 1968, after CBS abandoned the practice of assigning dedicated announcing crews to particular NFL teams, Summerall ascended to the network's lead national crew, pairing with Jack Buck and then Ray Scott. For the postgame coverage of the very first Super Bowl at the end of the 1967 season (which was simulcast by CBS and NBC), the trophy presentation ceremony was handled by CBS' Summerall (who worked as a reporter, while CBS' game coverage was called by Ray Scott, Jack Whitaker and Frank Gifford) and NBC's George Ratterman. Summerall and Ratterman were forced to share a single microphone. 

In 1969, Summerall took part in NBC's coverage of Super Bowl III. NBC used Summerall to provide an "NFL perspective" on the coverage. This was due in part to the fact that NBC was at the time, the network television provider of the American Football League (whereas CBS was the network television provider for the pre-merger National Football League). In return, for CBS Radio's coverage of Super Bowls I, II and IV, they used Tom Hedrick, normally the radio voice of the Kansas City Chiefs, to provide an "AFL perspective" for their coverage. 

Midway through the 1974 NFL season, CBS shifted Summerall from color to play-by-play. The network's #1 NFL crew now consisted of Summerall and analyst Tom Brookshier (with whom he had previously worked on This Week in Pro Football), and the colorful Summerall-Brookshier duo worked three Super Bowls (X, XII, and XIV) together. Summerall, Brookshier, NFL on CBS producer Bob Wussler, and Miami Dolphins owner Joe Robbie appeared as themselves during the 1977 film Black Sunday, which was filmed on location at the Orange Bowl in Miami during Super Bowl X. 

In 1981, Summerall was teamed with former Oakland Raiders coach John Madden, a pairing that would last for 22 seasons on two networks and become one of the most well-known partnerships in television sportscasting history. This was done against the wishes of Summerall, who expressed his liking of his broadcast partner Brookshier (who was demoted to regional broadcasts), although CBS executives were not too enthused by their casual chemistry, particularly since each admitted to doing heavy drinking the night before games; their coverage of Super Bowl XIV drew criticism from some in the press. Summerall and Madden were first teamed on a November 25, 1979 broadcast of a Minnesota Vikings–Tampa Bay Buccaneers game due to Brookshier having a family commitment.  While the two were paired on CBS, they called Super Bowls XVI, XVIII, XXI, XXIV, and XXVI together. It is often mistakenly assumed that Summerall and Madden handled the call on CBS for the 1981 NFC Championship Game, when San Francisco 49ers wide receiver Dwight Clark made "The Catch" to lift the 49ers to a 28–27 victory over the Dallas Cowboys and a berth in Super Bowl XVI. Instead, CBS' #2 broadcast team of Vin Scully and Hank Stram handled the broadcast, as Madden was given the weekend off to travel to Pontiac, Michigan to prepare for broadcast of the Super Bowl, with Summerall slated as Madden's announcer due to being chosen over Scully by CBS executives (the "audition" had Summerall paired with Madden for four games and paired with Stram when Scully was paired with Madden). Since Stram was Jack Buck's color commentator on CBS Radio, Summerall substituted for Stram as Buck's partner; this was the first time Buck and Summerall had called a game together since 1974, when then-lead color commentator Summerall was moved off of Buck's team to become CBS television's lead play-by-play voice for the NFL.  Like his predecessor, Ray Scott, Summerall was a minimalist (e.g.: Montana back to throw...Rice...Touchdown, San Francisco.), and also referred to teams by their city, seldom referring to them by their nicknames.

During the 1982 NFL strike, CBS' NCAA football contract required the network to show four Division III games. CBS initially intended to show those games on Saturday afternoons, with only the interested markets receiving the broadcasts. However, with no NFL games to show on Sunday, October 3, 1982, due to the strike, CBS decided to show all of its NCAA Division III games on a single Sunday afternoon in front of a mass audience. CBS used its regular NFL crews (Pat Summerall and John Madden at Wittenberg–Baldwin–Wallace, Tom Brookshier and Wayne Walker at West Georgia–Millsaps, Tim Ryan and Johnny Morris at Wisconsin–Oshkosh – Wisconsin–Stout, and Dick Stockton and Roger Staubach at San Diego–Occidental) and showed The NFL Today instead of using their regular college football broadcasters. 

Summerall's stature as pro football's premier television broadcaster was a result of two things: first, his ability to play the "straight man" alongside John Madden's lively, verbose persona; second, his economical delivery that magnified the drama of a moment while allowing the pictures and his baritone-like voice to tell the story. His style was closely modeled on that of his predecessor as CBS's main NFL announcer, Ray Scott, also known for his minimalist style. One of Summerall's most memorable on-air calls was his account of Marcus Allen's electrifying touchdown run in Super Bowl XVIII.

That the call is memorable despite its sparseness is testament to the weight of Summerall's voice when he was at the height of his powers as an NFL broadcaster. This was a hallmark of his broadcasting career. For example, he usually called a Joe Montana to Jerry Rice touchdown pass with simple calls like "Montana......Rice.... Touchdown!"

His last game alongside Madden for CBS (before the NFC television contract moved over to Fox) was the 1993 NFC Championship Game (which saw the Dallas Cowboys defeat the San Francisco 49ers in Irving, Texas to go to Super Bowl XXVIII against the Buffalo Bills in Atlanta).

Other CBS Sports assignments
Summerall also covered other events such as ABA for CBS during this period. Through 1966, he hosted a morning drive-time music/talk program for WCBS-AM radio in New York.

Summerall also broadcast PGA Tour golf tournaments on CBS, including the Masters Tournament, as well as the US Open of tennis, during his tenure at CBS with Tony Trabert, and he was the play-by-play announcer for the 1974 NBA Finals (working alongside Rick Barry and Rod Hundley), CBS' first season broadcasting the NBA on CBS. In 1975, Summerall hosted the Pan American Games in Mexico, and in 1976 he teamed with Tom Brookshier to call some heavyweight boxing matches for CBS.

Summerall broadcast his first Masters in 1968, when he anchored the coverage at hole 18. In 1983, Summerall replaced Vin Scully (who had left CBS to work for NBC on their Major League Baseball and golf coverage) in the 18th hole tower role (a role that Scully was in since 1975). Summerall's broadcast partner during this period was Ken Venturi.

From 1969–1973, Summerall broadcast CBS' National Invitation Tournament coverage with Don Criqui. In 1985, Summerall once again called college basketball, working NCAA men's tournament games for CBS with Larry Conley.

In 1970, Summerall and then-Boston Bruins' TV announcer Don Earle did a short postgame segment from inside the team's dressing room at the end of CBS' coverage of the fourth (and what turned out to be the final) game of the 1970 Stanley Cup Finals. WSBK-38, the Bruins' TV flagship at the time, simulcast the CBS coverage and did a longer post-game locker-room segment after CBS' coverage ended. After Bobby Orr scored the championship-winning goal after just 40 seconds, so the story went, Summerall turned to Bobby's father, Doug Orr (who was reportedly, too nervous to go back to his seat from the Bruins' dressing room for the start of overtime) and yelled over the crowd in the stands above "Mr. Orr, your son has scored and Boston has won the Stanley Cup!" Doug Orr is said to have told Summerall "I know Boston scored, but we didn't see it! What makes you think my son scored?" Summerall supposedly replied "Because they wouldn't be yelling this loudly if (Phil) Esposito (another high-scoring Boston player of the era) had scored!" 

Summerall also called at least one Professional Bowlers Association event, which was the 1975 Brunswick World Open.

On April 15, 1987, Summerall did color commentary alongside Steve Stone for a Chicago Cubs–Pittsburgh Pirates baseball game on WGN-TV. This was during time period in which the Cubs' normal television announcer, Harry Caray, was recovering from a stroke. Thus, for about the first two months of the 1987 season, WGN featured a series of celebrity guest announcers on game telecasts while Caray recuperated.

He also broadcast the US Open Tennis Tournament for CBS with Tony Trabert for 25 years.

Summerall's last on-air assignment for CBS Sports was the 1994 Masters Tournament. Summerall signed off the broadcast thus, surrounded by the other CBS commentators that were working the tournament:

Fox Sports

In 1994, the Fox network surprised NFL fans by outbidding CBS for the NFC broadcast package.  One of the network's first moves was to hire Summerall and Madden as its lead announcing team. While at Fox, the pair called Super Bowls XXXI, XXXIII, and XXXVI together. The long-time partnership ended after Super Bowl XXXVI in early 2002, as Summerall had announced he would be retiring from announcing and Madden's contract had expired.

Between CBS and Fox, Summerall called 11 Super Bowls on television play-by-play, a record matched by Al Michaels with Super Bowl LVI in 2022.

Summerall was lured out of retirement and re-signed with Fox for the 2002 season because Ray Bentley was let go. However, since Madden had left to take over the color commentator position on Monday Night Football from Dan Fouts and Dennis Miller for ABC and Fox had promoted Joe Buck to be its number one NFL play-by-play voice (Buck was initially partnered with Cris Collinsworth and, since 2004, Troy Aikman, who both replaced Madden as Fox's lead NFL color commentators), Summerall was paired with Brian Baldinger on regional telecasts. Most of the games Summerall covered featured the Dallas Cowboys, due in part to his residency in the city. One of the games Summerall called was the Cowboys' game against the Seattle Seahawks at Texas Stadium, in which Emmitt Smith broke Walter Payton's career rushing yardage record. Summerall was joined by Daryl Johnston, who at the time was working as Fox's #2 color man with Dick Stockton and who was a longtime teammate of Smith's with the Cowboys, for this game. 

Summerall retired again following the 2002 season but in 2006, he served as a substitute for Kenny Albert alongside Baldinger for the Week 8 (October 29) game between the eventual NFC champion Chicago Bears and the San Francisco 49ers. Summerall returned for one game the following year to take Stockton's place alongside Baldinger and provide the play-by-play for the December 9, 2007 game between the Cincinnati Bengals and St. Louis Rams in Cincinnati.

From 2007 until 2010, Summerall appeared as the play-by-play voice of the network's coverage of the Cotton Bowl Classic game. Summerall teamed with Brian Baldinger on the 2007–09 Cotton Bowl Classic telecasts, and worked with Daryl Johnston on the 2010 game (his final play-by-play assignment of any kind) between Ole Miss and Oklahoma State. In 2011, Summerall appeared on the pregame coverage of the Cotton Bowl.

Post-Fox
In the 2000s, Summerall provided voiceover sponsorship credits for the CBS Masters golf telecasts, and voice-overs for game coverage on NFL Network. He also provided game commentary for the Golden Tee Golf video game series and narrated the first episode of the WrestleMania Rewind series for the WWE Network (a role that would be assumed by Gary Thorne upon Summerall's death).

NFL on ESPN

Summerall called several preseason and early regular-season NFL games for the ESPN network in 2004, substituting for regular announcer Mike Patrick while the latter recovered from heart surgery.

Sports Stars of Tomorrow
As previously mentioned, Summerall hosted this syndicated program dedicated to high school and collegiate athletics from 2005 to 2012. Charles Davis assumed hosting duties in 2012.

Awards and honors
The National Sportscasters and Sportswriters Association named Summerall National Sportscaster of the Year in 1977, and inducted him into its Hall of Fame in 1994. Summerall was the 1994 recipient of the Pete Rozelle Radio-Television Award, bestowed by the Pro Football Hall of Fame "for longtime exceptional contributions to radio and television in professional football". In 1999, he was inducted into the American Sportscasters Association Hall of Fame.

Since 2006, the "Pat Summerall Award" has been presented at the annual Legends for Charity Luncheon given on Super Bowl weekend at the NFL's headquarters hotel in the host city. The award is given "to a deserving recipient who through their career has demonstrated the character, integrity and leadership both on and off the job that the name Pat Summerall represents." Recipients have included James Brown (2006), Greg Gumbel (2007), Jim Nantz (2008), Chris Berman (2009), Cris Collinsworth (2010), the entire Fox NFL crew (2011), Al Michaels (2012), Archie Manning (2013), Michael Strahan (2014), Joe Buck (2015), John Madden (2016), Rich Eisen (2017) and Tony Dungy (2018).

Outside sports broadcasting
For many years Summerall was a commercial spokesperson for True Value, often ending advertisements with his tag line "and tell 'em Pat Summerall sent you". Ironically, his long-time broadcast partner Madden was the spokesperson for Ace Hardware, True Value's main competitor in the independent hardware store market. Summerall served as the longtime radio spokesman for the Dux Beds company, a Swedish maker of mattresses, and its "Duxiana" stores.

Summerall started doing work as a commentator for the Madden NFL video game franchise in the game John Madden Football '92.  His voice was subsequently featured in all the games in the Madden franchise from 1994–2002.

Summerall also provided commentary, alongside Madden, on Cartoon Network's annual Super Bowl parodies, The Big Game, from 1998 through 2001.

Summerall was name-checked on The Simpsons in the episode "Springfield Up", where his caricature and name appear on the cover of a book held by Homer Simpson titled "Smut Yuks." Summerall and his partner John Madden also appeared in (and lent their voices to) the Simpsons episode "Sunday, Cruddy Sunday", which premiered following the duo's broadcast of Super Bowl XXXIII on Fox in 1999, and on the same night Summerall appeared on the Family Guy premiere episode "Death Has a Shadow". The pair was also featured in the movie The Replacements, calling the games of the Washington Sentinels on their run to the playoffs. Summerall is referenced in the Season 4 Gilmore Girls episode, "The Lorelais' First Day at Yale."

Summerall appeared in the music video for Forever the Sickest Kids' 2010 single "She Likes (Bittersweet Love)".

Personal life
Summerall was married to Cheri Summerall. As of 2013, they had 3 children, including political consultant Susie Wiles, and 10 grandchildren.

Summerall was a Christian. In his book, Summerall: On and Off the Air, he wrote about his faith and his recovery from alcoholism saying "My thirst for alcohol was replaced by a thirst for knowledge about faith and God. I began reading the Bible regularly at the Betty Ford treatment center, and it became a part of my daily life."

Health issues
During the 1990 season, Summerall was hospitalized with a bleeding ulcer after vomiting on a plane during a flight after a Chicago Bears–Washington Redskins game, and was out for a considerable amount of time.  While Verne Lundquist replaced Summerall on games with Madden, Jack Buck (who was at CBS during the time as the network's lead Major League Baseball announcer) was added as a regular NFL broadcaster to fill-in.

In the spring of 2004, Summerall, a recovering alcoholic, underwent a liver transplant. Summerall at one point preached a sermon at Travis Avenue Baptist Church in Ft. Worth, Texas.

In 2006, Pat Summerall underwent cataract surgery, and had an intraocular lens implanted.

In January 2008, Summerall had a hip replacement surgery. On June 19, 2008, he was hospitalized for internal bleeding caused by a new medicine he was taking.

In September 2018, James Acho filed a claim against the NFL for football-related dementia on behalf of Cheri Summerall, Summerall's widow. The lawsuit was settled a year later.

Death
Summerall checked into St. Paul University Hospital in Dallas, Texas, for surgery on a broken hip. He died there on April 16, 2013, of cardiac arrest at age 82. After his death, Jerry Jones referred to Summerall as "royalty in the broadcast booth" while Madden called him "a great broadcaster and a great man" and added that "Pat Summerall is the voice of football and always will be." Fellow broadcasters Jim Nantz and Verne Lundquist also made statements on Summerall's life.

A few days later, CBS Sports presented a tribute to Summerall during their coverage of the RBC Heritage golf event. Nantz and Gary McCord presented highlights of his life and career – both as a player and at CBS – ending with his 1994 Masters sign-off.
During a Fox NASCAR broadcast, Chris Myers paid tribute to Summerall on behalf of Fox.

Summerall was interred at the Dallas–Fort Worth National Cemetery.

See also
History of the New York Giants (1925–1978)

References

Bibliography
When Pride Still Mattered, A Life of Vince Lombardi, by David Maraniss, 1999,
Summerall, Pat and Levin, Michael (2010), Giants:What I learned about life from Vince Lombardi and Tom Landry, Hoboken, New Jersey:John Wiley and Sons, Inc.,

External links
 
 

1930 births
2013 deaths
20th-century Baptists
American Basketball Association announcers
American football placekickers
American military personnel of the Korean War
American radio sports announcers
American television sports announcers
Arkansas Razorbacks football players
Baptists from Texas
Bowling broadcasters
Boxing commentators
Chicago Cardinals players
College basketball announcers in the United States
College football announcers
Detroit Lions players
Golf writers and broadcasters
National Basketball Association broadcasters
National Football League announcers
New York Giants announcers
New York Giants players
NFL Films people
People from Dallas
People from Lake City, Florida
Pete Rozelle Radio-Television Award recipients
Players of American football from Florida
Tennis commentators
Washington Redskins announcers